Arın Soğancıoğlu (born 1987) is a Turkish professional basketball player who played for Beşiktaş, Erdemirspor, and Olin Edirne.

External links
 TBLStat.net Profile 

Living people
Turkish men's basketball players
1987 births
Place of birth missing (living people)
Eskişehir Basket players
Date of birth missing (living people)